Turritella duplicata is a species of sea snail, a marine gastropod mollusk in the family Turritellidae.

Description

Distribution
This marine species occurs in the Gulf of Bengal off Tharangambadi.

References

 Dautzenberg, Ph. (1929). Contribution à l'étude de la faune de Madagascar: Mollusca marina testacea. Faune des colonies françaises, III(fasc. 4). Société d'Editions géographiques, maritimes et coloniales: Paris. 321–636, plates IV-VII pp.

External links
 Linnaeus, C. (1758). Systema Naturae per regna tria naturae, secundum classes, ordines, genera, species, cum characteribus, differentiis, synonymis, locis. Editio decima, reformata [10th revised edition], vol. 1: 824 pp. Laurentius Salvius: Holmiae
 http://biodiversitylibrary.org/page/8967277

Turritellidae
Gastropods described in 1758
Taxa named by Carl Linnaeus